Absolom Riggs House, also known as the Mathias House, is a historic home located near Weatherby, DeKalb County, Missouri.  It was built about 1865, and is a two-story brick dwelling with an ell shaped plan.  It has a gable roof and an addition was built in 1902.  It is one of two examples of brick architecture in the county (the other is the Dalton-Uphoff House).

It was listed on the National Register of Historic Places in 1982.

References

Houses on the National Register of Historic Places in Missouri
Houses completed in 1850
Buildings and structures in DeKalb County, Missouri
National Register of Historic Places in DeKalb County, Missouri